City Theatre is a 400-seat theatre in the Hockeytown Café building in Downtown Detroit, Michigan. City theater produces and presents concerts, comedy shows, theatrical performances, and corporate events. Originally called "Second City Theater" the venue was home to a resident Second City comedy troupe. After the departure of Second City the theater adopted its current name "City Theater" in 2004. City Theater is owned and operated by Olympia Entertainment.

External links
City Theatre

Theatres in Detroit
Theatres completed in 2004
Olympia Entertainment